Replication factor C subunit 4 is a protein that in humans is encoded by the RFC4 gene.

Function 

The elongation of primed DNA templates by DNA polymerase delta and DNA polymerase epsilon requires the accessory proteins proliferating cell nuclear antigen (PCNA) and replication factor C (RFC). RFC, also named activator 1, is a protein complex consisting of five distinct subunits of 140, 40, 38, 37, and 36 kD. This gene encodes the 37 kD subunit. This subunit forms a core complex with the 36 and 40 kDa subunits. The core complex possesses DNA-dependent ATPase activity, which was found to be stimulated by PCNA in an in vitro system. Alternatively spliced transcript variants encoding the same protein have been reported.

Interactions 

RFC4 has been shown to interact with:
 BRD4, 
 CHTF18, 
 PCNA, 
 RFC2, 
 RFC3,  and
 RFC5.

References

Further reading